Phenylobacterium muchangponense is a Gram negative, aerobic, rod-shaped and non-motile bacterium from the genus of Phenylobacterium which has been isolated from beach soil from Muchangpo in Korea.

References

Caulobacterales
Bacteria described in 2012